Leveillula taurica is an obligate fungal pathogen, from the phylum Ascomycota, which causes powdery mildew on onion. This disease prefers warm, dry environments. It is rare in the United States, and is currently restricted to western states. Globally, it is also a minor problem with limited occurrences in the Middle East, Europe, and South America.  L. taurica causes powdery mildew of onions, but is also known to infect other allium, solanaceous, and cucurbit species. The disease has appeared in parts of the Middle East, the Mediterranean, and South and North America. Currently, it is not a cause for major concern in the U.S. and throughout the world, as its geographic extent is sparse. In addition, it is relatively easy to control through basic sanitation and reducing water stress.

Hosts and symptoms 

L. taurica is the pathogen responsible for powdery mildew on onions, but it can also infect peppers, tomatoes, eggplant, cotton, and garlic. While L. taurica can infect many different plants it is actually very host specific. Different races of L. taurica can only infect certain crops, and even specific cultivars within the same crop. An accurate way to describe its host specificity is that this disease is, “a composite species consisting of many host-specific races." Symptoms of Onion Powdery Mildew (OPM) are usually seen as circular or oblong lesions that are 5 to 20 mm and have a chlorotic or necrotic appearance. The lesions appear on older leaves before the bulb of the onion begins to form, but also can occur on the younger leaves towards the end of the season. As the disease progresses signs of OPM can also be seen. On the lesions white mycelium can be found with conidiophores bearing either lanceolate or rounded condia.

Disease cycle 

The polycyclic disease cycle of L. taurica is similar to that of other powdery mildew species. It overwinters (as chasmothecia) in crop residues above the soil surface. Under favorable climatic conditions, the chasmothecia open and release ascospores, which are wind-dispersed. The ascospores enter the host through its stomata, germinate, and colonize the host’s tissues with its mycelia. The pathogen then begins to produce its asexual conidia, either singly or on branched conidiophores. The conidia exit through the host’s stomata and serve as a secondary inoculum to spread disease after initial infection. In the fall, the pathogen undergoes sexual reproduction and again produces chasmothecia, its dormant, overwintering structure.

Environment 

The genus Leveillula is distributed in warm, arid areas of Africa, Asia, South America, southern Europe, and the western parts of North America. Species within the genus are adapted to xerophytic conditions, exemplified by the ability of their conidia to germinate rapidly and at any relative humidity. 
	L. taurica is primarily a disease of allium species—it has been documented on onions and garlic in Israel and southeastern Europe—but can also infect other species, including cucumbers, peppers, eggplants and tomatoes. It was first reported in the western United States in 1985, infecting onions in the state of California. It has since appeared in Idaho, the state of Washington, and Utah.

Management 

OPM tends to appear near the end of the growing season. The best way to control L. taurica is to remove all crop residue from the previous onion crop before subsequent planting.  Two methods to accomplish this include deep tillage, and rotating to a non-host crop the year following an onion crop. Controlling volunteer onion sprouting (or the emergence of the previous year's onion plants) will also assist in prevention of the pathogen from carrying-over from one year to the next.
 
Irrigation practices can also be used to limit the development of OPM. Moisture stress has been noted to increase the susceptibility of host species to L. taurica. Onions with adequate moisture will be more resistant to the pathogen, and onion crops with overhead irrigation rarely see powdery mildew development in the field.
 
The fungicide Cabrio (produced by BASF Chemical) is labeled for the control of L. taurica on onions, but the disease rarely progresses enough to justify the use of a fungicide. Considerations of economic benefit should be made before the fungicide is applied, and all labeling directions followed.
 
Resistant varieties have been found in some studies, Jahn et al. found powdery mildew resistance to be extremely beneficial in cucurbits, reducing the need for fungicide, and reducing agricultural losses due to powdery mildew pathogens. Although a truly resistant variety has not been found for onion plants, some onion genotypes with glossy leaves had selective susceptibility to L. taurica. Onions with the glossiest leaves were found to be most susceptible, while onions with less glossy leaves showed limited susceptibility. However, the study was unable to come to a conclusion on which variety was best suited for L. taurica resistance.

Importance 

The economic importance of OPM is limited, as the disease is sporadic, and  it rarely progresses enough to make fungicide treatment necessary. Because of the limited importance of OPM, data on incidence rates are not well documented. Simple cultural controls, as mentioned above, are usually effective in controlling losses associated with the disease.  The disease geography within the United States is limited to Idaho, Utah, California, and the Pacific Northwest. Findings have also occurred in Israel, Italy, Iran, Sudan, Brazil, and Southeastern Europe.

References

External links 
 Index Fungorum
 USDA ARS Fungal Database

Fungal plant pathogens and diseases
Vegetable diseases
Cotton diseases
Fungi described in 1851
Leotiomycetes
Taxa named by Joseph-Henri Léveillé